is a railway station in the town of Higashiura, Chita District, Aichi Prefecture, Japan, operated by Central Japan Railway Company (JR Tōkai).

Lines
Ishihama Station is served by the Taketoyo Line, and is located 4.6 kilometers from the starting point of the line at Ōbu Station.

Station layout
The station  has two opposed side platforms connected by a footbridge. The station has automated ticket machines, TOICA automated turnstiles and is unattended.

Platforms

Adjacent stations

|-
!colspan=5|Central Japan Railway Company

Station history
Ishihama Station was opened on April 15, 1957 as a passenger station on the Japan National Railway (JNR). With the privatization and dissolution of the JNR on April 1, 1987, the station came under the control of the  Central Japan Railway Company. Automatic turnstiles were installed in May 1992, and the TOICA system of magnetic fare cards was implemented in November 2006.

Station numbering was introduced to the Taketoyo Line in March 2018; Ishihama Station was assigned station number CE03.

Passenger statistics
In fiscal 2017, the station was used by an average of 1221 passengers daily (boarding passengers only).

Surrounding area
Higashiura Junior High School
Higashiura Public Library

See also
 List of Railway Stations in Japan

References

External links

Railway stations in Japan opened in 1957
Railway stations in Aichi Prefecture
Taketoyo Line
Stations of Central Japan Railway Company
Higashiura, Aichi